Nee Nanna Gellalare is a 1981 Indian Kannada-language film directed by Vijay and produced by S.A. Srinivas. The film stars Rajkumar and Manjula .

Though the movie managed to recover its budget, the movie's performance is considered to be underwhelming with a theatrical run of only 63 days (approximately) which was the lowest ever for a Rajkumar movie until the release of the 1987 film, Ondu Muttina Kathe, which, however, was more of an art movie with an immense cult following. This is the only movie of Rajkumar for which Ilaiyaraaja was the music composer.

Cast
 Rajkumar as Srikanth
 Manjula as Nalini
 K. S. Ashwath
 Balakrishna as Hayavadana Rao
 Sudarshan
 Chi. Udaya Shankar as David 
 Thoogudeepa Srinivas
 Sudheer 
 Shivaprakash
 Uma Shivakumar

Soundtrack
The music of the film was composed by Ilaiyaraaja with lyrics penned by Chi. Udaya Shankar. I Love You was set in Carnatic Raaga called Kapi; Anuraga Enaytu is based on Madhuvanthi raaga while the song Nanna Neenu Gellalaare is based on Shuddha Dhanyasi and Hindola raagas. The soundtrack I Love You has been recreated in a number of later movies - while the 2008 movie Moorane Class Manja B.Com Bhagya recreated the entire song using the original soundtrack, the 2009 movie Circus used the opening lines of the song . The opening lines were also recreated in a sequence for the 2018 movie -  The Villain.

Track list

References

External links
 
 Nee Nanna Gellalare songs

1980s Kannada-language films
1981 films
Films scored by Ilaiyaraaja
Films directed by Vijay (director)